Jett Adam Bandy (born March 26, 1990) is an American former professional baseball catcher. He has played in Major League Baseball (MLB) for the Los Angeles Angels and Milwaukee Brewers.

Early life
Jett Bandy was raised in West Hills, California, the second of four children. Bandy's first name is a portmanteau, after his father John, and grandfather Chet. John Bandy was responsible for teaching Tom Cruise flair bartending for the 1988 film Cocktail. Jett's mother is Sheryl.

Bandy first met his wife in 2012, while he was playing in the minor leagues.

Career

Amateur
Bandy attended Thousand Oaks High School in Thousand Oaks, California. The Los Angeles Dodgers selected him in the 41st round of the 2008 Major League Baseball draft, but he did not sign. Bandy enrolled at University of Arizona, and played college baseball for the Arizona Wildcats. In 2010, he played collegiate summer baseball in the Cape Cod Baseball League for the Yarmouth-Dennis Red Sox.

Los Angeles Angels
The Los Angeles Angels of Anaheim selected Bandy in the 31st round of the 2011 MLB Draft. He signed with the Angels and made his professional debut with the Arizona League Angels and also played for the Orem Owlz of the Pioneer League. He played for the Salt Lake Bees in 2011 and Inland Empire 66ers in 2012. Bandy played for the Double-A Arkansas Travelers in both 2013 and 2014.

Bandy made his Major League debut on September 14, 2015. In 2016, he batted .234/.281/.392 in 209 at bats.

Milwaukee Brewers
On December 13, 2016, Bandy was traded to the Milwaukee Brewers for Martín Maldonado and Drew Gagnon. He made the opening day roster, and began the 2017 season splitting playing time at catcher with Manny Piña. Following the acquisition of Stephen Vogt, formerly of the Oakland Athletics, and due in part to a recent slump, Bandy was optioned down to the Triple-A Colorado Springs Sky Sox on June 25. Bandy, however, was recalled from the Sky Sox after Vogt went on the disabled list for neck and leg injuries on July 17.

On May 25, 2018, Bandy was designated for assignment. On October 31, Bandy became a minor league free agent.

Texas Rangers
On November 7, 2018, Bandy signed a minor league contract with the Texas Rangers. He was assigned to the Triple-A Nashville Sounds for the 2019 season, hitting .231/.279/.430/.709 with 13 home runs and 33 RBI. He became a free agent following the 2019 season.

Boston Red Sox
On December 20, 2019, the Boston Red Sox signed Bandy to a minor league deal and invited him to spring training. He became a minor-league free agent on November 2, 2020. On February 22, 2021, Bandy re-signed with the Red Sox on a minor league contract and was invited to spring training. Bandy played in 34 games for the Triple-A Worcester Red Sox, hitting .208 with 3 home runs and 16 RBI's. On September 11, 2021, Bandy was released by the Red Sox.

References

External links

Arizona Wildcats bio

1990 births
Living people
People from West Hills, Los Angeles
Baseball players from Los Angeles
Major League Baseball catchers
Los Angeles Angels players
Milwaukee Brewers players
Arizona Wildcats baseball players
Yarmouth–Dennis Red Sox players
Arizona League Angels players
Orem Owlz players
Arkansas Travelers players
Salt Lake Bees players
Inland Empire 66ers of San Bernardino players
Mesa Solar Sox players
Leones del Escogido players
American expatriate baseball players in the Dominican Republic
Colorado Springs Sky Sox players
Wisconsin Timber Rattlers players
Nashville Sounds players
Worcester Red Sox players